La mère Bourgeois is a former restaurant in Priay, Ain, France, located 85 Grande rue de la Côtière. The restaurant was established in 1923 and was awarded the prestigious 3 Michelin stars under chef Marie Bourgeois between 1933 and 1937.

The restaurant was closed in 2010, and has been falling into ruin since this time.

See also
List of Michelin starred restaurants

References

External links
Official site

Michelin Guide starred restaurants in France
Restaurants established in 1923